Song Il-ho(송일호,born April 1955) is a North Korean diplomat. His current position is ambassador in charge of negotiations for normalization of diplomatic relations between Japan and North Korea.

Person 
On April 17, 2010, he made a public appearance after a long time, and he replied that the exclusion of Korean schools at this time under Japan's high school free school law would be ethnic discrimination, calling for good work, and that if it was made free of charge, what needed to be done in the abduction issue would be done. (Kyodo News in Pyongyang)

On September 9, 2015, in an interview with Kyodo News, he said that the report on the abductions was almost completed.

On October 5, 2016, he met with members of the Fukuoka Prefecture Japan-North Korea Friendship Association.

On September 18, 2019, he attended a meeting with the delegation headed by Shingo, the second son of Nobuo Kanamaru, a former deputy governor of the Liberal Democratic Party, and said that "concrete actions on the Part of a Japanese necessary.

References

1955 births
Living people
North Korean diplomats